The 2010 St Albans City and District Council election took place on 6 May 2010 to elect members of St Albans District Council in Hertfordshire, England. One third of the council was up for election and the Liberal Democrats stayed in overall control of the council.

After the election, the composition of the council was:
Liberal Democrats 29
Conservative 24
Labour 3
Independent 1
Vacant 1

Campaign
Before the election the Liberal Democrats ran the council with exactly half of the seats, relying on the independents and the mayor's casting vote to have control. The election took place at the same time as the 2010 general election with a seat being contested in all 20 wards of the council. The Liberal Democrats, Conservatives, Labour and Green parties stood for all of the seats, while there were 2 candidates from the United Kingdom Independence Party and 1 from the British National Party (BNP), making this the first time the BNP had stood for the council.

Key wards were seen as being Batchwood, London Colney and Sopwell, with the Labour group leader Roma Mills defending Batchwood. The Liberal Democrats defended their record in control of the council, pointing to no increase in council tax for the previous 2 years and work on preserving the green belt, recycling and congestion. However the Conservatives felt the election provided an opportunity for them to deprive the Liberal Democrats of a majority on the back of increased turnout due to the general election.

Election result
The Liberal Democrats retained control of the council with 29 seats after gaining 2 seats, but losing another 2. They took Batchwood from Labour by 1 vote, defeating the Labour group leader Roma Mills, and also Marshalswick South from the Conservatives. However they lost both Harpenden East and Wheathampstead to the Conservatives to remain on the same number of seats. Meanwhile, the Conservatives made a further 2 gains taking London Colney from Labour and Redbourn from an independent, Susan Carr, who did not contest the election. This put the Conservatives on 24 seats, while Labour held 3 and there was 1 independent.

One seat remained vacant in Ashley ward after the death of Liberal Democrat councillor Mike Ellis.

Ward results

By-elections between 2010 and 2011
A by-election was held in Ashley ward on 3 June 2010 after the death of Liberal Democrat councillor Mike Ellis. The seat was held for the Liberal Democrats by Andy Grant with a majority of 420 votes over Labour.

References

2010
2010 English local elections
May 2010 events in the United Kingdom
2010s in Hertfordshire